Alan David Lourie (born January 13, 1935) is a United States circuit judge of the United States Court of Appeals for the Federal Circuit.

Education and career

Born in Boston, Massachusetts, Lourie received an BA degree from Harvard College in 1956, a Master of Science in Organic Chemistry from the University of Wisconsin in 1958, a Doctor of Philosophy in Chemistry from the University of Pennsylvania in 1965, and a Juris Doctor from Temple University School of Law in 1970. He was a Chemist for Monsanto Corporation from 1957 to 1959, and then chemist and Patent Agent for Wyeth Labs in Radnor, Pennsylvania from 1959 to 1964. He was in-house counsel, to SmithKline Beecham Corporation from 1964 to 1990.

Federal judicial service

On January 24, 1990, Lourie was nominated by President George H. W. Bush to a seat on the United States Court of Appeals for the Federal Circuit vacated by Judge Daniel Mortimer Friedman. Lourie was confirmed by the United States Senate on April 5, 1990, and received his commission on April 6, 1990.

Patent outlook

He has been described as having a "pro-patent outlook" in the book Innovation and its Discontents by Harvard Business School professor Josh Lerner and by Brandeis University economics professor Adam B. Jaffe.

References

External links

1935 births
20th-century American judges
Harvard College alumni
Judges of the United States Court of Appeals for the Federal Circuit
Living people
Temple University alumni
United States court of appeals judges appointed by George H. W. Bush
University of Pennsylvania alumni
University of Wisconsin–Madison College of Letters and Science alumni